The 2019–20 season is Southern's 7th season in the top-tier division in Hong Kong football. Southern will compete in the Premier League, Senior Challenge Shield, FA Cup and Sapling Cup this season.

Squad

First Team
As of 30 June 2020

 FP
 FP 
 FP 
 (on loan from Eastern)
 FP 

 
 LP

 FP

Remarks:
LP These players are registered as local players in Hong Kong domestic football competitions.
FP These players are registered as foreign players.

Transfers

Transfers in

Transfers out

Loans In

Team staff

Competitions

Hong Kong Premier League

Table

Hong Kong Senior Challenge Shield

Hong Kong Sapling Cup

Group stage

Hong Kong FA Cup

Remarks

References

Hong Kong football clubs 2019–20 season